James Ehnes,  (born January 27, 1976) is a Canadian concert violinist and violist.

Life and career
Ehnes was born in Brandon, Manitoba, the son of Alan Ehnes, long time trumpet professor at Brandon University (Canada), and Barbara Withey Ehnes, former ballerina with Les Grands Ballets Canadiens, Ruth Page's International Ballet, and Chicago Ballet, and former director of the Brandon School of Dance. Ehnes began his violin studies at the age of four and at age nine became a protégé of the noted Canadian violinist Francis Chaplin. He studied with Sally Thomas at the Meadowmount School of Music and from 1993 to 1997 at The Juilliard School, winning the  Peter Mennin Prize for Outstanding Achievement and Leadership in Music upon his graduation.

James Ehnes toured with Jeunesses MusicalesCanada during the 1992-1993 season, when he was only 16 years old.

In October 2005, he was awarded a Doctor of Music degree (honoris causa) from Brandon University and in July 2007 he became the youngest person ever elected as a Fellow of the Royal Society of Canada. In 2010, he was made a Member of the Order of Canada.

Ehnes performs on the 1715 "ex-Marsick" Stradivarius.  His commercial recordings have won numerous awards and prizes, including 11 Junos, two Grammies, and two Gramophone Classical Music Awards - 2008 Best Concerto for Edward Elgar's Violin Concerto - 2021 Artist of the Year.

Ehnes was awarded the 2017 Royal Philharmonic Society Music Awards in the Instrumentalist category. Ehnes joined Royal Academy of Music as visiting professor of violin in 2017.

Ehnes is Artistic Director of the Seattle Chamber Music Society.  He and violinist Amy Schwartz Moretti, violist Richard O'Neill, and cellist Edward Arron perform as the Ehnes Quartet.

Ehnes lives in Ellenton, Florida with his wife and two children.

Discography

James Ehnes 
 1995 Niccolò Paganini: 24 Caprices for Solo Violin
 2000 Sergei Prokofiev: Violin Sonata No. 1 | Violin Sonata No. 2 | Five Melodies
 2000 Maurice Ravel: Violin Sonata No. 2 | Tzigane | Berceuse sur le nom de Gabriel Fauré, Claude Debussy: Violin Sonata, Camille Saint-Saëns: Violin Sonata No. 1
 2000 Johann Sebastian Bach: The Six Sonatas & Partitas for Solo Violin
 2000 French Showpieces - Camille Saint-Saëns: Introduction and Rondo Capriccioso | Havanaise, Hector Berlioz: Le corsaire | Rêverie et caprice, Ernest Chausson: Poème, Claude Debussy: Tarantelle styrienne, Darius Milhaud: Cinéma Fantaisie, Jules Massenet: Méditation from the opera Thaïs
 2001 Max Bruch: Violin Concertos Nos. 1 & 3
 2002 Bruch: Concerto No. 2 and Scottish Fantasy
 2002 Fritz Kreisler - Track 20. Petite Valse (Piano Solo: James Ehnes)
 2003 Robert Schumann: Piano Quintet, Gabriel Fauré: Piano Quintet No. 2
 2004 Romantic Pieces
 2004 Henryk Wieniawski | Pablo de Sarasate
 2004 Johann Nepomuk Hummel: Op. 94, Potpourri for Viola and Orchestra / Adagio and Rondo alla Polacca for Violin and Orchestra / Violin Concerto in G major
 2004 Ernő Dohnányi: Violin Concerto No. 2, Op. 43
 2004 Luigi Dallapiccola: Tartiniana (Divertimento for Violin and Orchestra)
 2005 John Adams: Road Movies for violin and piano, Hallelujah Junction for two pianos (Piano: Andrew Russo, James Ehnes)
 2005 Antonín Dvořák: Concertos
 2005 Bach: Sonatas for Violin and Harpsichord Vol.1
 2006 Bach: Sonatas for Violin and Harpsichord Vol.2
 2006 Wolfgang Amadeus Mozart: Violin Concertos 1-5
 2006 Samuel Barber, Erich Wolfgang Korngold, William Walton: Violin Concertos (50th Annual Grammy Awards - Best Instrumental Soloist(s) Performance (with orchestra))
 2007 Paul Schoenfield: Four Souvenirs for violin and piano, Café Music for piano trio
 2007 Edward Elgar: Violin Concerto (2008 Gramophone Classical Music Awards - Best Concerto)
 2008 Homage
 2009 Niccolò Paganini: 24 Caprices for Solo Violin.
 2010 Felix Mendelssohn: Violin Concerto, Octet
 2011 Béla Bartók: Violin Concerto No. 1 | Violin Concerto No. 2 | Viola Concerto
 2011 Pyotr Ilyich Tchaikovsky: Violin Concerto | Sérénade mélancolique | Valse-Scherzo | Souvenir d'un lieu cher (I. Méditation - II. Scherzo - III. Mélodie)
 2012 Bartók: Works for Violin and Piano, Vol. 1 - Rhapsody Folk Dances No. 1 | Rhapsody Folk Dances No. 2 | Violin Sonata No. 1 | Violin Sonata No. 2 | Andante
 2012 Tchaikovsky: The Sleeping Beauty
 2013 Bartók: Works for Violin and Piano, Vol. 2 - Sonata for Solo Violin | Violin Sonata in E minor | Romanian Folk Dances | Hungarian Folksongs | Hungarian Folk Tunes
 2013 Britten and Shostakovich violin concertos
 2013 Prokofiev: Complete Works for Violin - Violin Concerto No. 1 | Violin Concerto No. 2 | Violin Sonata No. 1 | Violin Sonata No. 2 | Sonata for Two Violins | Sonata for Solo Violin | Five Melodies
 2013 Tchaikovsky: Swan Lake
 2014 Khachaturian & Shostakovich: Violin Concerto & String Quartet no. 7 & 8
 2014 Bartók: Works for Violin and Piano, Vol. 3 - Contrasts for Violin, Clarinet, and Piano | Sonatina (Transcription for Violin and Piano) | 44 Duos for Two Violins
 2014 American Chamber Music: Aaron Copland | Charles Ives | Leonard Bernstein | Elliott Carter | Samuel Barber
 2015 Hector Berlioz: Reverie et Caprice, Op. 8 (violin) | Harold en Italie, Op. 16 (viola)
 2015 Cesar Franck and Richard Strauss: Violin Sonatas
 2015 Leoš Janáček: The Wandering of a Little Soul (Violin Concerto)
 2015 Aaron Jay Kernis: 2 Movements (with Bells)
 2015 The Essential James Ehnes (containing works by Bach, Kreisler, Prokofiev, Dvorak, Saint-Saens, and Berlioz)
 2016 Claude Debussy, Edward Elgar, and Ottorino Respighi: Violin Sonatas
 2017 Ludwig van Beethoven: Violin Sonata No. 9 | Violin Sonata No. 6
 2017 Beethoven: Violin Concerto | Romance no. 1 Op. 40 | Romance no. 2 Op. 50, Franz Schubert: Rondo in A major for Violin and Strings, D 438
 2017 Bartók: Rhapsody Folk Dances No. 1 | Rhapsody Folk Dances No. 2 (Violin and Orchestra)
 2018 William Walton: Viola Concerto
 2018 Ralph Vaughan Williams: The Lark Ascending
 2018 James Newton Howard: Violin Concerto, Aaron Jay Kernis: Concerto for Violin, Bramwell Tovey: Stream of Limelight (61st Annual Grammy Awards - Best Classical Instrumental Solo)
 2019 Richard Strauss: Violin Concerto
 2019 James Newton Howard: A Hidden Life (Original Motion Picture Soundtrack)
 2019 Beethoven: Op. 12 Violin Sonata No. 1 | Violin Sonata No. 2 | Violin Sonata No. 3, Variations on Se vuol ballare from Mozart's The Marriage of Figaro
 2020 Beethoven: Violin Sonata No. 4 | Violin Sonata No. 5 | Violin Sonata No. 8, Six German Dances, Rondo in G Major
 2020 Beethoven: Violin Sonata No. 7 | Violin Sonata No. 10
 2020 Bach & Brahms Reimagined - Johannes Brahms: Horn Trio, Bach: Brandenburg Concerto No. 2, Brandenburg Concerto No. 5
 2021 Eugène Ysaÿe: Six Sonatas for solo violin
 2021 Bach: Sonatas and Partitas for Solo Violin
 2022 Alban Berg: Violin Concerto

Ehnes Quartet 
 2016 Franz Schubert: String Quartet No. 14 in D Minor, D. 810, Jean Sibelius: String Quartet
 2021 Beethoven: String Quartet No. 13 | Grosse Fuge
 2021 Beethoven: String Quartet No. 12 | String Quartet No. 14
 2021 Beethoven: String Quartet No. 10 | String Quartet No. 11
 2022 Beethoven: String Quartet No. 15 | String Quartet No. 16

See also 
List of Canadian musicians
List of contemporary classical violinists

References

External links
 Official James Ehnes site
 Intermusica agency page on James Ehnes
 interview with James Ehnes - Vancouver Classical Music | Seen and Heard International (2017)
 James Ehnes in Conversation with Clemency Burton-Hill - Wigmore Hall Podcast (November 2017)
 James Ehnes on his string quartet and recording late Beethoven - Gramophone Podcast (2022)

1976 births
Living people
Canadian classical violinists
Male classical violinists
Musicians from Brandon, Manitoba
Members of the Order of Canada
Musicians from Manitoba
Juilliard School alumni
Juno Award for Classical Album of the Year – Large Ensemble or Soloist(s) with Large Ensemble Accompaniment winners
Canadian people of German descent
Fellows of the Royal Society of Canada
Canadian expatriate musicians in the United States
Grammy Award winners
Juno Award for Classical Album of the Year – Solo or Chamber Ensemble winners
21st-century classical violinists
21st-century Canadian male musicians
20th-century classical violinists
20th-century Canadian male musicians
20th-century Canadian violinists and fiddlers
Canadian male violinists and fiddlers